FMSLogo is a free implementation of a computing environment called Logo, which is an educational interpreter language. GUI and Extensions were developed by George Mills at MIT. Its core is the same as UCBLogo by Brian Harvey. It is free software, with source available, written with Borland C++ and WxWidgets.

FMSLogo supports multiple turtles, and 3D Graphics. FMSLogo allows input from COM ports and LPT ports. FMSLogo also supports a windows interface thus I/O is available through this GUI- and keyboard and mouse events can trigger interrupts. Simple GIF animations may also be produced with the GIFSAVE command. Jim Muller wrote The Great Logo Adventure, a complete Logo manual using MSWLogo as the demonstration language.

FMSLogo evolved from MSWLogo: An Educational Programming Environment, a free, open source implementation of the Logo programming language for Microsoft Windows. It is released under the GPL and is mainly developed and maintained by David Costanzo.

Features 
FMSLogo has following support of various functionality:
 "Standard" Logo parsing
 Turtle Graphics
 Exception handling
 TCP/IP networking
 Text in all available system fonts
 1024 independent turtles
 Bitmapped turtles
 MIDI devices
 Direct I/O for controlling external hardware (must be admin)
 Serial and parallel port communications
 Saving and loading images in BMP format
 Calling into native DLLs
 Creating windows dialog boxes
 Event driven programming (mouse, keyboard, timer)

References 

Interpreters (computing)
Educational programming languages
Logo programming language family